Wayne Morgan may refer to:

 Wayne Morgan (basketball) (born 1950), American men's basketball coach
 Wayne Morgan (cricketer) (born 1955), Australian cricketer
 Wayne Morgan (cyclist) (born 1965), New Zealand cyclist